Bernie Warnke Propellers, founded by Bernie Warnke, is an American manufacturer of wooden propellers for homebuilt and aerobatic aircraft. The company headquarters is located in Tucson, Arizona.

See also
List of aircraft propeller manufacturers

References 

Aircraft propeller manufacturers
Aerospace companies of the United States